Kullukkadu is a village in the Pattukkottai taluk of Thanjavur district, Tamil Nadu, India.

Demographics 

As per the 2001 census, Kullukkadu had a total population of 1899 with 951 males and 948 females. The sex ratio was 997. The literacy rate was 72.95%.

References 

 

Villages in Thanjavur district